Tylothais is a genus of sea snails, marine gastropod mollusks, in the subfamily Rapaninae of the family Muricidae, the murex snails or rock snails.

Species
Species within the genus Tylothais include:
 Tylothais aculeata (Deshayes, 1844)
 Tylothais akidotos Houart, 2017
 Tylothais funilata Houart, 2017
 Tylothais inhacaensis Houart, 2017
 Tylothais ovata Houart, 2017
 Tylothais savignyi (Deshayes, 1844)
 Tylothais virgata (Dillwyn, 1817)

References

 
Gastropods described in 2017